Running since 2015, the Collegiate Conference is the tournament held by the Shakey's V-League (SVL), a Filipino women's volleyball league. The tournament will be participated by various universities and colleges in the Philippines.

List of Collegiate Conference Champions

Per season

References

College women's volleyball tournaments in the Philippines